Delaney Miller (born April 6, 1995) is an American former professional rock climber. Although she is primarily a sport climber, in 2013 she took second to Sasha DiGiulian in The Heist, a bouldering competition by and for women. She placed second in the 2013 Psicocomp to DiGiulian, and placed second again in 2014 to Claire Buhrfeind. In April 2014, she beat out DiGiulian and Buhrfeind to become the Sports Climbing Series National Champion.

References 

Living people
1995 births
American rock climbers
People from Dallas